Rukometni Klub Sloga commonly referred to as RK Sloga or simply Sloga is a team handball club from Doboj, Bosnia and Herzegovina. The team currently competes in the Handball Championship of Bosnia and Herzegovina.

History
Sloga was founded in 1959. Until 1972 the club bore the name Partizan, Željezničar and Dobojindex, when it was finally changed to Sloga. RK Sloga was regular participant of Yugoslav top league between 1980 and 1991. In 1983 Sloga reached Yugoslav cup finals where it was defeated by then handball powerhouse Metaloplastika Šabac. In next season Sloga reached EHF Cup Winners' Cup final where it was defeated by FC Barcelona. The club competed in the regional SEHA League in 2013.

Honours

Domestic
Handball Championship of Bosnia and Herzegovina:
Winners (1): 2012
Handball Cup of Bosnia and Herzegovina:
Winners (2): 2005, 2006
Handball Cup of Yugoslavia:
Runner-up (1): 1983

European
EHF Cup Winner's Cup:
Runner-up (1): 1984

Team 2017–18

Current squad
Goalkeeper
  Đorđe Bosić
  Milutin Bogdanović
  Damir Efendić
  Božidar Bajović

Wingers
  Tarik Alibegović
  Luka Lazić
  Milan Pavlov
  Nikola Sauka
  Bojan Tulendić 
  Rajko Maričić
  Bojan Petrušić

Line players
  Branko Mišanović 
  Radovan Uljarević
Back players
  Srđan Gavrić
  Nemanja Zekić
  Miljan Ivanović
  Danijel Pejić
  Aleksandar Milojević   
  Borko Vještica
  Dušan Miličević
  Miloš Maksimović
  Luka Karanović

Recent seasons

The recent season-by-season performance of the club:

Notable players

 Đorđe Lavrnić
 Mario Kelentrić
 Drago Jovović
 Željko Đurđić
 Muhamed Memić
 Šandor Hodik
 Danijel Šarić
 Faruk Vražalić
 Peđa Dejanović
 Faruk Halilbegović
 Vladimir Grbić

Coaching history
 Aleksandar Dugić
 Vojislav Malešević
 Slobodan Mišković
 Đorđe Lavrnić
 Josip Glavaš
 Dušan Pavlović
 Vojislav Rađa
 Milanko Savčić
 Branislav Živanić
 Aleksandar Dugić
 Zoran Dokić
 Goran Stojić
 Jasmin Unkić
 Igor Pijetlović
 Milorad Gračanin
 Mario Kelentrić (2020–2021)

References

Bosnia and Herzegovina handball clubs
Doboj